Wright State University is a public research university in Fairborn, Ohio. Originally opened in 1964 as a branch campus of Miami University and Ohio State University, it became an independent institution in 1967 and was named in honor of aviation pioneers Orville and Wilbur Wright, who were Dayton residents. The university offers bachelor's, master's, and doctoral degrees, and it is classified among "R2: Doctoral Universities – High research activity". Its athletic teams, the Wright State Raiders, compete in Division I of the NCAA as members of the Horizon League. In addition to the main campus, the school also operates a regional campus near Celina, Ohio, called Wright State University–Lake Campus.

History

Founding
Wright State University first opened in 1964 as a branch campus of Miami University and Ohio State University, occupying only a single building. Groundwork on forming the institution began in 1961 during a time when the region lacked a public university for higher education. A community-wide fundraising effort was conducted in 1962 to establish the university, and the campaign raised the $3 million needed in seed money. Much of the land that the campus was built on was donated by the United States Air Force from excess acreage of Wright-Patterson Air Force Base.

The Ohio General Assembly passed legislation in 1965 that transformed the branch campus into a separate institution with its own Advisory Committee on November 5, 1965. It was anticipated the campus would achieve full independent status by 1967 with its rapidly increasing enrollment of full-time students, projected to reach 5,000 within two years. On October 1, 1967, the campus officially became Wright State University following a decision by the Ohio Board of Regents. The name honors the Wright brothers, well-known Dayton residents who are credited with inventing the world's first successful airplane. In 1969, a  branch campus opened on the shore of Grand Lake St. Marys in Celina, Ohio

2017–present
Wright State University celebrated its 50th anniversary in 2017, creating a website to highlight milestones and events throughout the university's history. The celebration culminated at Homecoming on September 30 – October 1, 2017. That same year, the university officially became tobacco-free on its Dayton and Lake campuses. Smoking cessation products, such as nicotine-replacement gum, lozenges, and patches were not banned. The tobacco-free decision was made following a recommendation in 2012 from the Ohio Board of Regents that all public universities in Ohio transition to tobacco-free campuses.

Wright State's faculty, which are unionized and represented by the American Association of University Professors (AAUP), went on strike in 2019 following two years of failed contract negotiations. The faculty were joined by various groups, including other labor unions, community members, and a student-led labor rights group called Students for Faculty. An agreement was reached the following month, ending the strike, but its length of twenty days was the longest in Ohio history among higher education institutions and one of the longest in US history

Susan Edwards became university's president on January 1, 2020. Previous university presidents were Brage Golding (1966–1973), Robert J. Kegerreis (1973–1985), Paige E. Mulhollan (1985–1994), Harley E. Flack (1994–1998), Kim Goldenberg (1998–2006), David R. Hopkins (2007–2017), and Cheryl B. Schrader (2017–2019). Curtis L. McCray was the interim president from March 17 through June 30, 2017, holding the position following Hopkins' early retirement on March 17, 2017. Schrader was Wright State's seventh president—and first female president—from mid 2017 until she stepped down at the end of 2019 midway through her five-year appointment.

Politics

2008 presidential campaign
During the 2008 United States presidential campaign, Republican nominee John McCain announced his selection of Sarah Palin as his running mate and choice for vice president on August 29, 2008 at Wright State. Palin was a relatively unknown figure at the time and the current Governor of Alaska, but soon became a major figure in modern American politics. Eventual winner Barack Obama, who became the first African-American president in American history, held a major rally at Wright State during the campaign as well.

2016 presidential campaign
On September 23, 2015, the Commission on Presidential Debates named Wright State the host for the first 2016 United States presidential debate, which was scheduled for September 26, 2016 at the Nutter Center. On July 19, 2016, Wright State University backed out of the debate, citing inability to cover the cost of security.

Academics

The university is accredited by the Higher Learning Commission at the doctoral degree-granting level. Wright State is divided into seven colleges and three schools.

Undergraduate programs
Wright State offers 106 bachelor degrees in the following colleges: the Raj Soin College of Business, the College of Education and Human Services, the College of Engineering and Computer Sciences, the College of Liberal Arts, the College of Nursing and Health, and the College of Science and Mathematics. The Lake Campus also offers a limited number of complete bachelor's and master's degrees, as well as 15 associate degrees.

Graduate programs
Wright State offers 136 graduate programs (including doctoral programs) through the Wright State University Graduate School, the Boonshoft School of Medicine, and the School of Professional Psychology. The Lake Campus also offers a limited number of graduate programs.

School of Medicine

The Wright State University Boonshoft School of Medicine was established in 1973. It is accredited by the Liaison Committee on Medical Education. In the 2018-19 academic year, the school had 480 M.D. students, 51 Master of Public Health (M.P.H.) students, 30 M.B.A. students with a concentration in health care management, and 71 M.S. in Pharmacology and Toxicology students. The school adopted its current name in 2005 in honor of the Oscar Boonshoft family, major donors to the medical school.

Reserve Officer Training Corps
Wright State University offers Air Force Reserve Officer Training Corps (ROTC) and Army ROTC programs on campus, known as Detachment 643 and the Raider Battalion, respectively. The Air Force ROTC program contains the cross town schools of the University of Dayton, Cedarville University, and Sinclair Community College and is the largest AFROTC detachment in the Northeast Region.

Ohio Center of Excellence in Knowledge-Enabled Computing (Kno.e.sis) 

Kno.e.sis center was founded in 2007. In 2009, the Ohio Department of Higher Education established more than 50 Centers of Excellence representing key industrial areas with potential future growth. Kno.e.sis at the Wright State University was one of the selections in the area of Bio-Health Innovations. Research at the center focuses on multidisciplinary areas such as Web 3.0 (Semantic Web, Semantic Sensor Web), Network Science, Social Data Analysis, Machine Learning, Data Mining, Bioinformatics, Natural Language Processing, Visualization, Cloud Computing, High Performance Computing.

In recent years, Kno.e.sis has had near 80–100 researchers including 15 faculty and over 60 funded graduate (primarily PhD) students. Kno.e.sis researchers overtime have contributions in the areas related to Computer Science with focus on topics in World Wide Web, including Semantic web, Social Data Analysis, Semantic Sensor Web, and Linked Open Data. Furthermore, they have been a part of developing technical specifications and guidelines for W3C, until 2013.

Collaboration, Education, Leadership, and Innovation in the Arts

In the fall of 2009, Wright State University's three departments of Art, Music, and Theatre, Dance, & Motion Pictures inaugurated a new initiative of collaborative artistic and educational endeavor, called CELIA (Collaboration, Education, Leadership, and Innovation in the Arts), dedicated to enhancing "ongoing collaborations as well as nurture new partnerships." Projects accepted for the CELIA designation demonstrate high-quality, innovative collaborations, and the ability to further strengthen the reputation of the arts at Wright State.

One of the first of these projects was the Academy Award-nominated half-hour documentary The Last Truck, produced for HBO and broadcast on Labor Day, 2008. The film documented the closing of a major GM truck plant in Moraine, Ohio, in 2008. More recently, the Department of Theatre, Dance and Motion Pictures co-produced the regional and university premiere production of August: Osage County in the fall of 2010, with the region's professional theatre, The Human Race Theatre Company.  In May 2011, the departments of Music and Theatre, Dance and Motion Pictures collaborated with the Dayton Philharmonic a full-stage production of the Mass by Leonard Bernstein at the Benjamin and Marian Schuster Performing Arts Center in Dayton.

On October 20, 2011, CELIA was designated an Ohio Center of Excellence by Jim Petro, Chancellor of the Ohio Board of Regents at a press conference on the campus of Wright State University, in which Tom Hanks congratulated the Wright State University arts programs via a video message.

Greek life
Wright State University currently hosts three North American Interfraternity Conference fraternities, Alpha Sigma Phi, Phi Kappa Tau, and Sigma Phi Epsilon; five National Panhellenic Conference sororities, Alpha Omicron Pi, Alpha Xi Delta, Delta Zeta, Kappa Delta, and Zeta Tau Alpha; and four of the nine members of National Pan-Hellenic Council fraternities and sororities, Alpha Phi Alpha, Alpha Kappa Alpha, Phi Beta Sigma, and Sigma Gamma Rho; and the university’s first Asian-interest sorority, Kappa Phi Lambda.

Athletics

The Wright State Raiders are the athletics teams of Wright State University. The school participates in fifteen sports at the Division I level of the NCAA, and are members of the Horizon League. The school's mascot is Rowdy Raider, a wolf. The Raiders men's basketball team participated in the 2018 NCAA Tournament for the first time since 2007, the program's third trip to "The Dance."

Notable people

Alumni

Faculty

References

External links

Wright State University Athletics website

 
Wright State University
Educational institutions established in 1964
Wright
Wright
Public universities and colleges in Ohio
Buildings and structures in Greene County, Ohio
1964 establishments in Ohio